Ralsko Solar Park is the largest photovoltaic power station in the Czech Republic. It was one of the 50 largest photovoltaic power plants in the world when it was built. It consists of five sections, of 14.269 MW, 12.869 MW, 6.614 MW and 4.517 MW, located kilometers apart, for a total of 38.3 MW, sufficient for 10,000 households. It was built in a former military area.

References 

Solar power stations in the Czech Republic
Buildings and structures in the Ústí nad Labem Region